Ust-Charyshskaya Pristan is a rural locality (a selo), founded in 1773, and the administrative center of Ust-Pristansky District of Altai Krai, Russia, located along the Ob River in the West Siberian Plain,  south of Barnaul. Population:

References

Rural localities in Ust-Pristansky District
Tomsk Governorate
Populated places established in 1773